The Police Act 1997 is a United Kingdom Act of Parliament passed on 21 March 1997. Its main purposes are:
to make provision for the National Criminal Intelligence Service (NCIS) and the National Crime Squad;
to make provision about entry onto, and interference with, property and with wireless telegraphy for the prevention or detection of serious crime;
to make provision for the Police Information Technology Organisation;
to provide for the issue of criminal record certificates;
to address aspects of the administration and organisation of the police; and 
to repeal certain legislation relating to the rehabilitation of offenders.

The case of R v. Khan (1996), which was heard by the House of Lords, was one on the factors leading to the regulation of police powers embodied in this legislation.

The function of the NCIS was to gather and analyse intelligence data in order to provide insight and intelligence to national police forces. Its role was later taken over by the Serious Organised Crime Agency.

The Criminal Records Bureau, now known as the Disclosure and Barring Service, was established under Part V of the Police Act 1997 and was launched in March 2002.

References

United Kingdom Acts of Parliament 1997
Law enforcement in the United Kingdom